In the United States, a political action committee (PAC) is a 527 organization that pools campaign contributions from members and donates those funds to campaigns for or against candidates, ballot initiatives, or legislation. The legal term PAC was created in pursuit of campaign finance reform in the United States. Democracies of other countries use different terms for the units of campaign spending or spending on political competition (see political finance). At the U.S. federal level, an organization becomes a PAC when it receives or spends more than $1,000 for the purpose of influencing a federal election, and registers with the Federal Election Commission (FEC), according to the Federal Election Campaign Act as amended by the Bipartisan Campaign Reform Act of 2002 (also known as the McCain–Feingold Act). At the state level, an organization becomes a PAC according to the state's election laws.

Contributions to PACs from corporate or labor union treasuries are illegal, though these entities may sponsor a PAC and provide financial support for its administration and fundraising. Union-affiliated PACs may solicit contributions only from union members. Independent PACs may solicit contributions from the general public and must pay their own costs from those funds.

Overview
Federal multi-candidate PACs may contribute to candidates as follows:
 $5,000 to a candidate or candidate committee for each election (primary and general elections count as separate elections);
 $15,000 to a political party per year; and
 $5,000 to another PAC per year.
 PACs may make unlimited expenditures independently of a candidate or political party

In its 2010 case Citizens United v. FEC, the Supreme Court of the United States overturned sections of the Campaign Reform Act of 2002 (also known as the McCain–Feingold Act) that had prohibited corporate and union political independent expenditures in political campaigns. Citizens United declared it was unconstitutional to prohibit corporations and unions from spending from their general treasuries to promote candidates or from contributing to PACs.  It left intact these laws' prohibitions on corporations or unions contributing directly to a candidate or candidate committee.

History

The political action committee emerged from the labor movement of 1943. The first PAC was the CIO-PAC, formed in July 1943 under CIO president Philip Murray and headed by Sidney Hillman. It was established after the U.S. Congress prohibited unions from giving direct contributions to political candidates. This restriction was initially imposed in 1907 on corporations through the Tillman Act. The Smith–Connally Act extended its coverage to labor unions in 1943. A series of campaign reform laws enacted during the 1970s facilitated the growth of PACs after these laws allowed corporations, trade associations, and labor unions to form PACs.

Categorization

Federal law formally allows for two types of PACs: connected and non-connected. Judicial decisions added a third classification, independent expenditure-only committees, which are colloquially known as "Super PACs".

Connected PACs
Most of the 4,600 active, registered PACs, named "connected PACs", sometimes also called "corporate PACs", are established by businesses, non-profits, labor unions, trade groups, or health organizations. These PACs receive and raise money from a "restricted class", generally consisting of managers and shareholders in the case of a corporation or members in the case of a non-profit organization, labor union or other interest group. As of January 2009, there were 1,598 registered corporate PACs, 272 related to labor unions and 995 to trade organizations.

Non-connected PACs
Groups with an ideological mission, single-issue groups, and members of Congress and other political leaders may form "non-connected PACs". These organizations may accept funds from any individual, connected PAC, or organization. As of January 2009, there were 1,594 non-connected PACs, the fastest-growing category.

Leadership PACs
Elected officials and political parties cannot give more than the federal limit directly to candidates. However, they can set up a leadership PAC that makes independent expenditures. Provided the expenditure is not coordinated with the other candidate, this type of spending is not limited.

Under the FEC (Federal Election Commission) rules, leadership PACs are non-connected PACs, and can accept donations from individuals and other PACs. Since current officeholders have an easier time attracting contributions, Leadership PACs are a way dominant parties can capture seats from other parties. A leadership PAC sponsored by an elected official cannot use funds to support that official's own campaign.  However, it may fund travel, administrative expenses, consultants, polling, and other non-campaign expenses.

In the 2018 election cycle, leadership PACs donated more than $67 million to federal candidates.

Controversial use of leadership PACs
 Former Rep. John Doolittle's (R-CA) leadership PAC paid 15% to a firm that employed only his wife. Payouts to his wife's firm were $68,630 in 2003 and 2004, and $224,000 in 2005 and 2006. The Doolittle home was raided in 2007. After years of investigation, the Justice Department dropped the case with no charges in June 2010.
 One Leadership PAC purchased $2,139 in gifts from Bose Corporation.
 Former Rep. Richard Pombo (R-CA) used his leadership PAC to pay hotel bills ($22,896) and buy baseball tickets ($320) for donors.
 Speaker of the House Nancy Pelosi's (D-CA) leadership PAC, Team Majority, was fined $21,000 by federal election officials "for improperly accepting donations over federal limits."

Super PACs
Super PACs, officially known as "independent expenditure-only political action committees," are unlike traditional PACs in that they may engage in unlimited political spending (on, for example, ads) independently of the campaigns, and may raise funds from individuals, corporations, unions, and other groups without any legal limit on donation size. However, they are not allowed to either coordinate with or contribute directly to candidate campaigns or party coffers. Super PACs are subject to the same organizational, reporting, and public disclosure requirements of traditional PACs.

Super PACs were made possible by two judicial decisions in 2010: the aforementioned Citizens United v. Federal Election Commission and, two months later, Speechnow.org v. FEC. In Speechnow.org, the federal Court of Appeals for the D.C. Circuit held that PACs that did not make contributions to candidates, parties, or other PACs could accept unlimited contributions from individuals, unions, and corporations (both for profit and not-for-profit) for the purpose of making independent expenditures.

The result of the Citizens United and SpeechNow.org decisions was the rise of a new type of political action committee in 2010, popularly dubbed the "super PAC". In an open meeting on July 22, 2010, the FEC approved two Advisory Opinions to modify FEC policy in accordance with the legal decisions. These Advisory Opinions were issued in response to requests from two existing PACs, the conservative Club for Growth, and the liberal Commonsense Ten (later renamed Senate Majority PAC). Their advisory opinions gave a sample wording letter which all Super PACs must submit to qualify for the deregulated status, and such letters continue to be used by Super PACs up to the present date. FEC Chairman Steven T. Walther dissented on both opinions and issued a statement giving his thoughts. In the statement, Walther stated "There are provisions of the Act and Commission regulations not addressed by the court in SpeechNow that continue to prohibit Commonsense Ten from soliciting or accepting contributions from political committees in excess of $5,000 annually or any contributions from corporations or labor organizations" (emphasis in original).

The term "Super PAC" was coined by reporter Eliza Newlin Carney. According to Politico, Carney, a staff writer covering lobbying and influence for CQ Roll Call, "made the first identifiable, published reference to 'super PAC' as it's known today while working at National Journal, writing on June 26, 2010, of a group called Workers' Voices, that it was a kind of super PAC' that could become increasingly popular in the post-Citizens United world."

According to FEC advisories, Super PACs are not allowed to coordinate directly with candidates or political parties. This restriction is intended to prevent them from operating campaigns that complement or parallel those of the candidates they support or engaging in negotiations that could result in quid pro quo bargaining between donors to the PAC and the candidate or officeholder. However, it is legal for candidates and Super PAC managers to discuss campaign strategy and tactics through the media.

Disclosure rules
By January 2010, at least 38 states and the federal government required disclosure for all or some independent expenditures or electioneering communications. These disclosures were intended to deter potentially or seemingly corrupting donations. Contributions to, and expenditures by, Super PACs are tracked by the FEC and by independent organizations such as OpenSecrets.

Yet despite disclosure rules, political action committees have found ways to get around them. 
The 2020 election attracted record amounts of donations from dark money groups to political committees like super PACs. These groups are required to reveal their backers, but they can hide the true source of funding by reporting a non-disclosing nonprofit or shell company as the donor. By using this tactic, dark money groups can get around a 2020 court ruling that attempts to require nonprofits running political ads to reveal their donors.

It is also possible to spend money without voters knowing the identities of donors before voting takes place. In federal elections, for example, political action committees have the option to choose to file reports on a "monthly" or "quarterly" basis. This allows funds raised by PACs in the final days of the election to be spent and votes cast before the report is due and the donors identities' are known.

In one high-profile case, a donor to a super PAC kept his name hidden by using an LLC formed for the purpose of hiding the donor's name.  One super PAC, that originally listed a $250,000 donation from an LLC that no one could find, led to a subsequent filing where the previously "secret donors" were revealed. However, campaign finance experts have argued that this tactic is already illegal, since it would constitute a contribution in the name of another.

Pop Up super PACs
A "Pop-Up" Super PAC is one that is formed within 20 days before an election, so that its first finance disclosures will be filed after the election. In 2018 the Center for Public Integrity recorded 44 pop-up Super PACs formed on October 18 or later, a year when the Federal Election Commission pre-general election reports covered activity through October 17. In 2020 there were more than 50. 

Pop-up Super PACs often have local-sounding or issue-oriented names. However they can be funded by much larger party-affiliated PACs. In 2021 the Campaign Legal Center filed a complaint with the FEC, listing 23 pop-up Super PACs which had failed to disclose their affiliation to other PACs mostly affiliated with leaderships of the two major parties.

2012 presidential election
Super PACs may support particular candidacies. In the 2012 presidential election, Super PACs played a major role, spending more than the candidates' election campaigns in the Republican primaries. As of early April 2012, Restore Our Future—a Super PAC usually described as having been created to help Mitt Romney's presidential campaign—had spent $40 million. Winning Our Future (a pro–Newt Gingrich group) spent $16 million. Some Super PACs are run or advised by a candidate's former staff or associates.

In the 2012 election campaign, most of the money given to super PACs came from wealthy individuals, not corporations. According to data from OpenSecrets, the top 100 individual super PAC donors in 2011–2012 made up just 3.7% of contributors, but accounted for more than 80% of the total money raised, while less than 0.5% of the money given to "the most active Super PACs" was donated by publicly traded corporations.

As of February 2012, according to OpenSecrets, 313 groups organized as Super PACs had received $98,650,993 and spent $46,191,479. This means early in the 2012 election cycle, PACs had already greatly exceeded total receipts of 2008. The leading Super PAC on its own raised more money than the combined total spent by the top 9 PACS in the 2008 cycle.

Super PACs have been criticized for relying heavily on negative ads.

The 2012 figures do not include funds raised by state level PACs.

2016 presidential election
In the 2016 presidential campaign, Super PACs were described (by journalist Matea Gold) as "finding creative ways to work in concert" with the candidates they supported and work around the  "narrowly drawn" legal rule that separated political campaigns from outside groups/SuperPACs. "Nearly every top presidential hopeful" had "a personalized super PAC" that raised "unlimited sums and was "run by close associates or former aides". Not only did the FEC regulations allow campaigns to "publicly signal their needs to independent groups", political operatives on both sides "can talk to one another directly, as long as they do not discuss candidate strategy." Candidates are even allowed by the FEC "to appear at super PAC fundraisers, as long as they do not solicit more than $5,000".  

Representative David E. Price (D–NC) complained “The rules of affiliation are just about as porous as they can be, and it amounts to a joke that there’s no coordination between these individual super PACs and the candidates.”  As of mid-2015, despite receiving 29 complaints about coordination between campaigns and Super PACs, "FEC has yet to open an investigation".

2020 presidential election
According to Open Secrets, in the 2019-2020 cycle (as of October 29, 2022) 2,415 groups organized as super PACs; they had reported total receipts of a little over $2.5 billion and total independent expenditures of a little under $1.3 billion.

Hybrid PAC

A hybrid PAC (sometimes called a Carey Committee) is similar to a Super PAC, but can give limited amounts of money directly to campaigns and committees, while still making independent expenditures in unlimited amounts.

2020 presidential election
In 2019, Bernie Sanders and Elizabeth Warren self-imposed fundraising restrictions, including "swearing off PAC money." While they do not accept direct financial contributions from either connected or non-connected PACs, both Sanders and Warren were supported by at least one Super PAC.

Top PACs by election cycle
OpenSecrets maintains a list of the largest PACs by election cycle on its website OpenSecrets.org. Their list can be filtered by receipts or different types of expenses, political party, and type of PAC.

2018 election
In the 2018 election, the top ten PACs donated a total of $29,349,895 (directly, and via their affiliates and subsidiaries) to federal candidates:

 National Association of Realtors PAC  $3,444,276
 National Beer Wholesalers Association PAC  $3,433,500
 AT&T PAC $3,433,500
 Northrop Grumman PAC  $2,849,740
 National Air Traffic Controllers Association PAC  $2,813,250
 International Association of Sheet Metal, Air, Rail and Transportation Workers PAC  $2,797,450
 American Bankers Association PAC  $2,768,330
 House Freedom Fund, a leadership PAC associated with Mark Meadows $2,733,340
 International Union of Operating Engineers PAC  $2,726,909
 National Auto Dealers Association PAC  $2,666,400

See also
 List of political action committees
 501(c)(4) organizations
 Advocacy group
 Campaign finance in the United States
 Issue advocacy ads
 Lobbying in the United States
 Money loop
 Politics of the United States
 Soft money
 Dark money

References

External links
  FEC.gov – Political Action Committees (PAC)
 FEC.gov – Speechnow.org v. FEC
 OpenSecrets.org from OpenSecrets
 FactCheck.org Players Guide 2012
 FactCheck.org Players Guide 2016
 FactCheck.org Players Guide 2018
 PoliticalMoneyLine dot-com company that offers some free information; detailed info requires a subscription
 Sunlight Foundation

Campaign finance in the United States
Political terminology
 
Lobbying in the United States